Shutter Island is a 2003 novel by Dennis Lehane.

Shutter Island may also refer to:

 Shutter Island (graphic novel), a 2009 graphic novel based on Lehane's novel, adapted by Christian de Metter.
 Shutter Island (film), a 2010 film based on Lehane's novel, directed by Martin Scorsese and starring Leonardo DiCaprio.